Recurvaria consimilis is a moth of the family Gelechiidae. It is found in North America, where it has been recorded from Illinois, Kentucky, Ohio and West Virginia.

The wingspan is about 8.5–9.5 mm. The forewings are black, with scattered bluish white scales and a black spot near the base of the dorsum, a minute patch of raised black scales at the base of the fold and three larger such patches in a row, the first two below the fold, the third above, each edged behind with bluish white scales, and a fourth smaller patch just beyond the dorsal arm of the fascia. Above the second of the row is a smaller similar patch and there are also black spots on the costa at the basal third, the middle and two-thirds. The third inwardly margins a narrow sinuate white fascia on the costa. The hindwings are silvery grey, deeper toward the apex.

The larvae feed on Ceanothus americanus. They mine the leaves of their host plant. The mine starts half-depth and runs longitudinally alongside the mid-vein of the leaf. The larva then makes a full-depth mine that runs towards the lateral leaf margin and later runs from the lateral tracks toward the apex of the leaf.

References

Moths described in 1930
Recurvaria
Moths of North America